Scott A. Gordon served as the ninth president of Stephen F. Austin State University from August 17, 2019, to April 10, 2022.

Early life and education
Gordon is a native of Malone, New York, and was a first-generation college student. He received his bachelor's degree in biology from the State University of New York at Cortland and earned a master's degree and doctorate in botany and mycology from the University of Tennessee in Knoxville. He also holds certifications in educational management and leadership from the Harvard University Graduate School of Education.

Career

University of Southern Indiana
Gordon was affiliated with the University of Southern Indiana (USI) for 22 years (1994 to 2016) and served as dean of the Pott College of Science, Engineering and Education from 2005 to 2016. In addition, he served for 10 years as the faculty athletics representative, was named an NCAA faculty athletic representative fellow, and was vice president and treasurer of the Great Lakes Valley Conference, which includes 14 NCAA Division II institutions.

At USI, Gordon piloted a technology commercialization academy that allowed engineering and business students to develop ideas and business strategies around the commercialization of intellectual property.

Eastern Washington University
As Eastern Washington University (EWU) provost and vice president for academic affairs from 2016 to 2019, Gordon continued his work to provide students with real-world experience in finding useful applications for existing technologies. He developed partnerships with community colleges, business and industry, as well as government entities – work that was highlighted by a unique partnership of multiple businesses in The Catalyst, a 140,000-square-foot facility in downtown Spokane. He encouraged development of a new degree program based on course materials developed by Microsoft to produce graduates with data analytics experience in order to meet the fluctuating needs of 21st-century employers.

As EWU's chief academic officer, Gordon was charged with overseeing more than 500 faculty members in six academic colleges, with responsibility for academic policy and planning, distance education, international programs and institutional research. Gordon wanted to reorganize Academic Affairs, but left with the plan unfinished. Reorganization was not completed until two years after he left EWU.

Stephen F. Austin State University
At Stephen F. Austin State University (SFA) he was named sole finalist for the position of president on July 23, 2019, and unanimously confirmed by the SFA Board of Regents on August 17, 2019.  The search for SFA's president was led by the Dallas-based firm R. William Funk & Associates.  At SFA, Gordon established a budget prioritization process and developed new tuition models to lower the cost of attendance.

On September 9, 2021, the SFA Faculty Senate voted no confidence in Gordon, citing initiatives with no results, breaches of shared governance, and troublesome personal behavior cited as "bullying and unreasonably impatient behavior both in public and in private." Every Academic Dean and Academic Department Head joined the Faculty Senate in their concerns and support of the "no confidence" vote.

On April 10, 2022, at a meeting of the SFA Board of Regents, SFA announced that the university and President Gordon mutually agreed to end his tenure after faculty objected to his pay raise. The Board of Regents appointed Steve Westbrook as interim president to replace him. Gordon was paid $809,124.46 in severance plus up to $30,000 in moving expenses, eligible reimbursable expenses, as well as vacation days. Forty-five people signed confidentiality agreements constraining them from speaking about this deal including the Regents, deans, and accountants, which came to light two months later. The Nacogdoches Daily Sentinel reported: "Gordon gets 'approved talking points' in future job recommendations. Regents are not allowed to give an honest assessment."

References 

1967 births
Living people
20th-century American botanists
21st-century American botanists
State University of New York at Cortland alumni
University of Tennessee alumni
University of Indianapolis faculty
Stephen F. Austin State University faculty